Medicine Lake is a natural lake in South Dakota, in the United States.

The lake's name comes from the Sioux Indians of the area, who believed the waters of Medicine Lake held medicinal qualities.

See also
List of lakes in South Dakota

References

Lakes of South Dakota
Lakes of Codington County, South Dakota